The STARTS Prize is the grand prize of the European Commission that honors projects that demonstrate the successful integration of science, technology and art to contribute to social and economic innovation.

Two grand prize winners and up to ten honorary mentions are selected by an international jury each year. One grand prize is awarded for innovative collaboration between industry or technology and the arts that open new pathways for innovation. A second grand prize is awarded for artistic exploration and art works where appropriation by the arts has a strong potential to influence or alter the use, deployment or perception of technology. The prize is funded under Horizon 2020 and is awarded on behalf of the European Commission, Ars Electronica in collaboration with BOZAR and Waag Society.

Winners and honorary mentions

References

European science and technology awards
Awards established in 2016
Arts awards